Pierre Tarin (1725–1761) was a French doctor, writer, and translator, born in Courtenay.  He is best known for his contributions to Encyclopédie by Diderot and D'Alembert.

Publications 
 Problemata anatomica, utrum inter arterias mesentericas, venasqne lacteas, immediatum datur commercium, Parisiis, 1748. in-8°.
 Anthropotomie, ou l’art de disséquer, Paris, 1750, deux vol. in-12.
 Adversaria anatomica, Parisiis, 1750, in-8°, avec figures.
 Démosgraphie, ou description des ligaments du corps humain, Paris, 1752, in-8°.
 Éléments de physiologie traduits du Latin de Haller, Paris, 1752,in-8°.
 Dictionnaire anatomique, suivi d’une Bibliothèque anatomique et physiologique, Paris, 1753, in-4°.
 Ostéographie , ou description des os de l’adulte, du fœtus, etc. Paris, 1753, in-4°.
 Myographie ou description des muscles, Paris, 1753, in-4°.
 Observations de médecine et de chirurgie, Paris, 1755, 3 vol. in-12.

Articles in Encyclopédie 
 "Bile", t. II, p. 249b, 218 l.
 "Dents", t. IV, 320 l.

References 

 Antoine Laurent Jessé Bayle, Biographie médicale, t. 2, Paris : Adolphe Delahaye, 1855, p. 738.

1725 births
1761 deaths
Contributors to the Encyclopédie (1751–1772)
18th-century French physicians
Latin–French translators
University of Paris alumni
French male non-fiction writers
18th-century French male writers
18th-century French translators